Kastenlauf (literally beer crate-running) or Bier-Rallye, is a drinking game that is played in Austria, Germany and Switzerland. It is a race among teams that consist of at least two people carrying a crate of beer, the contents of which must be consumed prior to crossing the finish line. The first team to cross the finish line after drinking all of their beer is considered the winner. The teams are usually also required to retain all their bottle caps, as an anti-littering measure.

In Munich, kastenlauf events have been organized since 1982. Kastenlaufs are also common among young people while en route to a beer festival, especially on its first day.

References

"Vogelsberger Kastenlauf"

Drinking games
Alcohol in Germany
Alcohol in Switzerland
Alcohol in Austria